HMS Maidstone was a submarine depot ship of the Royal Navy. It operated in the Mediterranean Sea, Indian Ocean and Pacific Ocean during the Second World War. It was later used as a barracks ship and then a prison ship in Northern Ireland.

Facilities

It was built to support the increasing number of submarines, especially on distant stations, such as the Mediterranean Sea and the Pacific Far East. Its equipment included a foundry, coppersmiths, plumbing and carpentry shops, heavy and light machine shops, electrical and torpedo repair shops and plants for charging submarine batteries. It was designed to look after nine operational submarines, supplying over 100 torpedoes and a similar number of mines. Besides large workshops, there were repair facilities for all materiel in the attached submarines and extensive diving and salvage equipment was carried. There were steam laundries, a cinema, hospital, chapel, two canteens, a bakery, barber shop, and a fully equipped operating theatre and dental surgery.

Career

Second World War

In September 1939 Maidstone was depot ship to the ten submarines of the 1st Submarine Flotilla. In March 1941 it went to Gibraltar. From November 1942, Maidstone was based at Algiers Harbour, the main Allied base in the Mediterranean. In November 1943 it was assigned to the Eastern Fleet. In September 1944 Maidstone and the 8th Submarine Flotilla were transferred from Ceylon to Fremantle in Western Australia to operate in the Pacific.

In late 1945 Maidstone left Fremantle, and en route to the UK, docked in the Selborne dry dock at Simonstown, South Africa. In November 1945, it arrived at Portsmouth.

During the war Maidstone was adopted by the Borough of Maidstone as part of Warship Week.  The plaque from this adoption is held by the National Museum of the Royal Navy in Portsmouth.

Postwar
In 1946 Maidstone became mother ship to the 2nd and 7th Submarine Flotillas. The 2nd Flotilla comprised operational boats, the latter a trials and training squadron. Maidstone had a semi-permanent mooring off Monkey Island (Portland) but often put to sea with its subsidiary ships. In 1951 Maidstone called briefly at Corunna to land a sick crewman.  This was not classified an official visit, although it was the first time a British warship had entered a Spanish harbour since the end of the Spanish Civil War. In 1953, it took part in the Fleet Review to celebrate the Coronation of Queen Elizabeth II.

On 16 June 1955 the submarine  sank in Portland harbour alongside Maidstone 20 minutes after an explosion in the forward torpedo compartment. A rescue party from Maidstone saved a number of the Sidons crew, but 13 died. A week later, the submarine was raised and the accident was found to be caused by the high-test peroxide fuel in a torpedo. Surgeon Lieutenant Charles Rhodes was posthumously awarded the Albert Medal for his part in the rescue.

In 1956 Maidstone was the flagship of the Commander-in-Chief, Home Fleet. In September 1957, the Soviet Union protested when Maidstone accompanied the training aircraft carrier  on a visit to Helsinki. In 1959 Maidstone received an extensive refit to accommodate nuclear submarines and the 2nd Flotilla was then moved to Devonport. In 1961 Maidstone sailed to Faslane, on Gareloch, where it was the depot ship to the 3rd and 10th Submarine Squadrons. In 1965, it undertook a trip to Liverpool, and it visited the same port one year later. It also undertook a trip to Rothesay during this period and then, in 1968, it sailed to Rosyth Dockyard to undertake preparations to permanently retire the Maidstone. The Norwegian navy considered buying it, as did HM Prison Service, who decided the facilities onboard, used by hundreds of sailors, were only suitable for 50 or so prisoners.

Belfast
In October 1969 Maidstone was refitted and re-commissioned as accommodation for 2,000 troops and sent to Belfast. In 1969, it arrived under tow at Belfast to serve as barracks for the increased security forces in the area. In 1971, it was used as a prison ship in Operation Demetrius as a place to hold internees without trial, including Gerry Adams. The holding area itself was at the stern and consisted of two bunkhouses, one up, one down, and two mess rooms. Above these were the rooms of the governor and his staff (previously the captain's cabin) and above this was the deck, used twice a day for exercise. The deck was surrounded by -high barbed wire. It was moored in Belfast harbour  from the land, entry to the jetty being guarded by sand-bagged army emplacements. Maidstone was also notable for the escape of seven Provisional IRA members on 17January 1972. The men swam close to  through icy water and evaded army and police and later held a press conference. On 9 April 1972 all internees were moved to Long Kesh prison (HM Prison Maze).

The presence of the ship in Belfast Harbour drew attention to the constitutional status of Northern Ireland's territorial waters, which had long been a point of contention with the Irish government. By early 1975 the ship remained at Sydenham Wharf in Belfast as part of the Royal Naval Operation in Northern Ireland, to provide immediate short-notice accommodation for the Army, should significant reinforcements be required and to provide ad-hoc accommodation for UK Service Personnel visiting the Province.

Fate
On 23 May 1978, Maidstone was broken up for scrap at the Thos. W. Ward scrapyard in Inverkeithing. The ship's bell is now located at Maidstone Grammar School, where it is rung to signify the start of assemblies.

See also

References

Publications
 

Prison ships
Ships built on the River Clyde
Cold War fleet auxiliaries of the United Kingdom
Auxiliary ships of the Royal Navy
Royal Navy Submarine Depot Ships
Defunct prisons in Northern Ireland
1937 ships
The Troubles (Northern Ireland)
Prison escapes
Internment camps during the Troubles (Northern Ireland)
Internment camps in the United Kingdom